WinSock File Transfer Protocol, or WS_FTP, is a secure file transfer software package produced by Ipswitch, Inc. Ipswitch is a Massachusetts-based software producer established in 1991 that focuses on networking and file sharing. WS_FTP consists of an FTP server and an FTP client and has over 40 million users worldwide.

In 2019 Ipswitch Inc was acquired by Progress Software Corporation, who is the current owner of the product.

History
John A. Junod, a decorated Army master sergeant, developed WS_FTP in 1993. WS_FTP was originally released as Shareware. The rights were sold to Ipswitch in 1996 when Junod retired from the Army and joined Ipswitch.

Overview
File Transfer Protocols are used to transfer large files. FTP clients add stability and encryption options over traditional FTP transfers. The WS_FTP client has a "classic" GUI with two panes, one showing the local computer and the other accessing the remote host, though newer versions of the software have updated interfaces, including a web browser interface. The WS_FTP secure server encrypts files using SSL/FTPS, SSH, or SCP2 and HTTPS transfers. It is self-contained, eliminating the need for an external database. WS_FTP's additional built-in capabilities include email client integration, alerts and notification, server failover, and transfer scheduling.

See also
Comparison of FTP client software

References

External links 
 Progress website
Ipswitch blog
 WS_FTP Professional
 WS_FTP Server

FTP clients
Windows-only shareware
Articles with underscores in the title